Charles Greenwood may refer to:

 Charles Greenwood (Wisconsin politician) (1852-1925), American businessman and politician
 Charles Greenwood (pastor) (1891–1969), Pentecostal Christian pastor in the Assemblies of God